Gia Michele Milinovich (born 11 July 1969) is an American-British television presenter and writer.

Early life
Milinovich was born in Minnesota to an ethnic Serbian family,.

Career
She presented television programmes such as Channel 4's Demolition Day (2003–06), as well as Sky Sports, Nickelodeon and BBC Radio 5 Live shows. She produced the "behind the scenes" website for the film Sunshine and was part of the technical support team for the BBC programme Electric Dreams in 2009.

Politics
Milinovich is a convenor of the cross-party political movement, More United.

Personal life
She married English particle physicist and television presenter Brian Cox in Duluth, Minnesota in 2003. They have one son together.

Filmography

Television
 TVFM– The Children's Channel (1994)
 The Electric String Vest – The Children's Channel (1993–94) Hot or Not– Nickelodeon (1995)
 Ice warriors – Sky Sport (1995–96)
 The Big Byte – BBC Radio 5 (1995–96)
 Sky Sport Live – BSkyB (1995–2000)
 Cliff Richard's Pro Celebrity Tennis – BSkyB (1998)
 The Kit'- BBC Knowledge (1999–2000)
 The Circuit, The Pulse, 10 x 10, The Object – Network of the World (2000–2002)
 And God Created Gadgets – Channel 4 (2002)
 Click Online – BBC World (2002–2003)
 Demolition Day – C4 & Discovery (2003–06)
 LBC Radio – Gadget Expert (2006–07)
 The Cinema Show – BBC Four (2006–07)
 The Most Annoying TV We Hate to Love – BBC Three (2007)
 Charlie Brooker’s Screenwipe – BBC Four (2008)
 The One Show – BBC One (2009)
 Richard & Judy – UKTV Watch (2009)
 Electric Dreams – BBC Four (2009)

Film
 The X Files: I Want To Believe (UK release)
 Sunshine
 28 Weeks Later

References

External links
 
 

1969 births
American emigrants to England
American expatriates in England
Living people
American television producers
American women television producers
British television producers
British women television producers
British television presenters
American technology writers
British technology writers
Women technology writers
Naturalised citizens of the United Kingdom
British women television presenters
American people of Serbian descent
British people of Serbian descent